Sittin' Fat Down South is the debut studio album by American rapper Lil' Troy. It was released by Lil Troy and Master P's former manager, Tobin "TC" Costen on June 23, 1998 under Short Stop/ Me & Mine Entertainment. A few months later he signed to Universal and re-released the album worldwide on May 18, 1999. The album was produced by Bruce "Grim" Rhodes and certified Platinum on October 12, 1999 by the RIAA with over 1.9 million copies sold in America. It features the hit "Wanna Be a Baller".

Tracks
 "Intro" - 0:17
 "Thugs Niggas" (featuring Lil' 2 Low & Scoop)  - 3:27
 "Ain't No Luv" (featuring Bad Co., Big Ced & Nattie)  - 4:20
 "Wanna Be a Baller" (featuring: Yungstar, Fat Pat, Big T) - 5:55
 "Chop, Chop, Chop" (featuring Botany Boyz & Rasheed)  - 3:51
 "Small Time" (featuring Lil' 2-Low, Scarface & Lil' Will)  - 3:49
 "Still a Bitch" (featuring Bad Co. & Nattie)  - 3:20
 "Where's the Love" - 4:24 (featuring Willie D)
 "Loyal to the Sign" (featuring Ardis) - 3:57
 "Another Head Put to Rest" (featuring Scarface) - 5:17
 "Dem Niggas" (featuring Ardis) - 3:51
 "Diamond & Gold" (featuring Lil' Will) - 2:59
 "Rollin'" (featuring Bad Co., Big Ced & Nattie)  - 5:07
 "Wanna Be a Baller" (featuring: Big T, Yungstar, Fat Pat, Lil' Will & H.A.W.K.) - 3:39

Album chart positions

Singles chart positions

References

Lil' Troy albums
1998 debut albums